Linkwood may refer to

 Linkwood (whisky distillery), a distillery and eponymous single malt Scotch whisky
 Linkwood, Maryland an unincorporated community in Maryland, United States
 Linkwood Wildlife Management Area, a wildlife area near that town